A permanent crop is one produced from plants which last for many seasons, rather than being replanted after each harvest.

Traditionally, "arable land" included any land suitable for the growing of crops, even if it was actually being used for the production of permanent crops such as grapes or peaches. Modern agricultureparticularly organizations such as the CIA and FAOprefer the term of art  to describe such cultivable land that is not being used for annually-harvested crops such as staple grains. In such usage, permanent cropland is a form of agricultural land that includes grasslands and shrublands used to grow grape vines or coffee; orchards used to grow fruit or olives; and forested plantations used to grow nuts or rubber. It does not include, however, tree farms intended to be used for wood or timber.

See also
 Agricultural land
 Arable land
 Perennial crop
 Permaculture

References

Crops